The Pontax River is a river in Quebec, Canada. It flows into James Bay just north of Rupert River

External links 
 Commission de toponymie - Québec

References

Rivers of Nord-du-Québec